Sitaram Spinning and Weaving Mills is a Kerala Government managed mills situated in Poonkunnam, Thrissur City of Kerala, India. It was the first mill in Thrissur district. It was established in Poonkunnam by TR Ramachandra Iyer in the early 1940s. The spinning wing has the capacity of 12,000 spindles and German made machines. The mill can process 40,000 meters of cloth every day.

References

Government-owned companies of Kerala
Companies based in Thrissur
Textile companies of India
1940s establishments in India
Manufacturing companies established in the 20th century